Louder Than Bombs is a 2015 drama film directed by Joachim Trier and starring Jesse Eisenberg, Devin Druid, Gabriel Byrne, Isabelle Huppert, David Strathairn, and Amy Ryan. The film was internationally co-produced and was co-written by Trier and Eskil Vogt.

Louder Than Bombs was Trier's first English-language film. It was selected to compete for the Palme d'Or at the 2015 Cannes Film Festival, and was shown in the Special Presentations section of the 2015 Toronto International Film Festival. It won the Nordic Council Film Prize.

Plot

Several years before the events of the film, Isabelle Reed (Isabelle Huppert), a conflict photographer, died in a car crash. In the present, a retrospective of her work and an article about her life and death is being released, putting her widower, Gene (Gabriel Byrne), in a crisis as his younger son, Conrad, who was twelve at the time of Isabelle's death, has no idea that she died by suicide.

Conrad meanwhile is angry, aggressive and seemingly suicidal himself, frequently fantasizing about his mother and her death and obsessing over one of his female classmates. Jonah, Isabelle and Gene's oldest child, comes down to visit his father and Conrad and also go over his mother's work before it is donated to a museum. Though Jonah appears to his father to be the normal, stable one, he refuses to believe that his mother died by suicide and censors her work, deleting some of her photographs which appear to show her having an affair. At the hospital, when his child is being born, Jonah runs into an old girlfriend, Erin, whose mother is dying of cancer. He allows her to believe that his wife also has cancer. Wanting to return home after visiting his father and brother Jonah stops by Erin's house and the two have sex with Jonah telling Erin that he has never told his wife about his mother or the way she died. After the encounter, rather than return home, he goes back to his father's house and lies to his wife telling her that the family needs him more than he expected.

Jonah and Conrad bond, with Conrad allowing Jonah to read portions of his diary which reveal the explanations behind his seemingly odd and random behaviour. Conrad wants to give the diary to Melanie, the girl he has a crush on, but Jonah dissuades him from doing so telling him she will laugh at him. Conrad ignores his brother's advice and prints out his diary, leaving it on Melanie's stoop.

Gene gives Isabelle's work to her old friend Richard, who is the one writing the article, giving him permission to curate her work to see what is personal and what is not. Richard reveals to him that he and Isabelle had an ongoing affair overseas but that she was never interested in continuing the affair at home.

Richard's article comes out earlier than expected and Jonah takes the news poorly. As Gene hasn't had the chance to tell Conrad yet he repeatedly tries to contact him, but Conrad ignores him and goes to a party where he is able to hang out with Melanie. As she is drunk he walks her home. Returning to his own home Conrad asks his father if what the paper said about Isabelle is true. He accepts the news graciously, but tells his father that Jonah is handling the situation badly.

Jonah is unable to return home having avoided his wife and child for a while now, but Gene offers to drive him there. Gene, Conrad, and Jonah drive in the car towards Jonah's home, and Conrad recounts a dream he had in which his mother brought home a baby from overseas who was an old man that was actually Jonah's baby.

Cast
 Gabriel Byrne as Gene Reed
 Isabelle Huppert as Isabelle Reed
 Jesse Eisenberg as Jonah Reed
 Devin Druid as Conrad Reed
 David Strathairn as Richard
 Amy Ryan as Hannah
 Rachel Brosnahan as Erin
 Leslie Lyles as The Principal
 Ruby Jerins as Melanie
 Megan Ketch as Amy Reed
 Charlie Rose as himself

Production
On 9 May 2013, Eisenberg, Byrne, and Huppert joined the film, which Trier was set to direct as his English-language debut. On 29 August, the film was postponed indefinitely due to financial problems. On 5 February 2014, Arte France Cinema was on board to finance the film. On 4 September, Strathairn and Ryan joined the cast of the film. On 9 September, Brosnahan joined the film to play Eisenberg's character's ex-girlfriend.

Filming
On 21 August 2014, it was reported that the crews started the preparations for the shooting of the film on Northern Boulevard in Bayside, New York. The eight-week of filming began on 4 September 2014, in New York City.

Reception
Louder Than Bombs received generally positive reviews from critics. On review aggregator Rotten Tomatoes, the film holds a 72% approval rating based on 130 reviews, with an average rating of 6.8/10. The site's consensus says that the film "finds director Joachim Trier using a capable cast in pursuit of some lofty dramatic goals, even if his ambitions occasionally evade his grasp." Metacritic, which assigns a weighted average score out of 100 to reviews from mainstream critics, reports the film has a score of 70 based on 32 reviews.

Ignatiy Vishnevetsky of The A.V. Club described the film as "the kind of multi-faceted, ambitious, incompletely resolved American drama that American filmmakers never seem to get around to making: novelistic in subject and structure, but completely cinematic in the way it expresses itself, even if Trier’s camera style never rises to the sophistication of his influences."

References

External links
 
 
 
 

2015 films
English-language Norwegian films
English-language French films
English-language Danish films
Norwegian drama films
French drama films
Danish drama films
Films about dysfunctional families
Films directed by Joachim Trier
Films shot in New York City
Films with screenplays by Eskil Vogt
2015 drama films
Films about grieving
Films about mother–son relationships
Films about father–son relationships
2010s English-language films
2010s French films